SS Alexander Majors was a Liberty ship built for the United States Maritime Commission during World War II. The ship was named in honor of Alexander Majors an American who with William Hepburn Russell and William B. Waddell founded the Pony Express. The ship was assigned by the War Shipping Administration to Isthmian Steamship Company of New York who operated it throughout World War 2. Alexander Majors was Laid down on 27 December 1943, launched on 20 January 1944 and completed on 4 March 1944, with the hull No. 2262 as part of the Emergency Shipbuilding Program.

Attacked
Alexander Majors was part of the supply ships that supported the Battle of Leyte from 7 October to 26 December 1944 in the Pacific war campaign of World War II. Her United States Navy Armed Guard shot the plane down. In the afternoon another kamikaze plane attacked Alexander Majors. The plane hit a second plane that crashed into Alexander Majors mainmast. The plane exploded, killing two crew and blowing the cargo cover off cargo holds #3 and #4. Fire starting in the two cargo holds. The Armed Guards help shoot down the third plane. The explosion blew some of the crew overboard. The explosion knocked out the ship fire fighting gear. But a Navy LCI fire fighting ship was able to come alongside and put out the fire in the two cargo holds. The cargo in hold #3 and #4 was a complete loss, kapok life jackets in #3 took days to put out. Alexander Majors, still operational, continued to defend off more planes. She destroyed a plane on November 24. There were 160 more attacks from November 4 to December 4, but she survived each. Her burnt two cargo holes, deck, bridge and two lifeboats were repaired or replaced. The kamikaze attack was at 11°11'N, 125°05'E. In addition to the two crewmen killed, one seaman was hit by shrapnel metal, one Armed Guard was hospitalized at Leyte, 11 Armed Guards and two United States Army were burnt by the fire. At the end of the war, she was turned over to the Army Transportation Service and was operated as a troop ship to bring home vets as part of Operation Magic Carpet. The Army Transportation Service renamed her the SS Alexander Majors USAT.

Post war
After the war, in 1947, she was sold to a private party, Soc.di Nav.Italia in Genoa, Italy and operated as an Italian flagship. She was renamed SS Tritone In 1972 she was laid up at Trieste. In 1973 she was scrapped at Sant'Angelo in Vado.

See also
 Allied technological cooperation during World War II
 List of Liberty ships
 Type C1 ship
 Type C2 ship
 Victory ship
 U.S. Merchant Marine Academy

References

External links
U.S. Maritime Service Veterans 

Liberty ships
Ships built in Richmond, California
1944 ships